The martens constitute the mammal genus Martes within the subfamily Mustelinae, in the family Mustelidae.

Martens may also refer to:

 Martens (surname)
 Dr. Martens or Doc Martens, a brand of shoe
 Sint-Martens-Latem, a municipality in East Flanders, Belgium
 Sint-Martens-Lierde, a village in East Flanders, Belgium

See also
 Martins (disambiguation)
 Marten (disambiguation)